Cottage Grove Community Hospital was founded by PeaceHealth after the existing community hospital declared bankruptcy. It is located in Cottage Grove, Oregon, in southern Lane County. The facility provides 24-hour emergency care and a 14-bed inpatient unit.

This hospital is not part of the Oregon state trauma system. Major trauma patients are transported to Sacred Heart Medical Center in Springfield.

See also
List of hospitals in Oregon

References

 

Hospital buildings completed in 2003
Hospitals in Oregon
Hospitals established in 2003
Cottage Grove, Oregon
Buildings and structures in Lane County, Oregon
2003 establishments in Oregon